Franzisca Bernadina Wilhelmina Elisabeth Ney (26 January 1833 – 29 June 1907) was a German-American sculptor who spent the first half of her life and career in Europe, producing portraits of famous leaders such as Otto von Bismarck, Giuseppe Garibaldi and King George V of Hanover. At age 39, she immigrated to Texas with her husband, Edmund Montgomery, and became a pioneer in the development of art there. Among her most famous works during her Texas period were life-size marble figures of Sam Houston and Stephen F. Austin, commissions for the Texas State Capitol. A large group of her works are housed in the Elisabet Ney Museum, located in her home and studio in Austin. Other works can be found in the United States Capitol, the Smithsonian American Art Museum, and numerous collections in Germany.

Early life

Ney was born in Münster, in the Province of Westphalia, to Johann Adam Ney, a stonecarver and alleged nephew of Field Marshal Michel Ney, and Anna Elizabeth on January 26, 1833. The only other surviving child in the Ney family was her older brother, Fritz. Her parents were Catholics of Alsatian-Polish heritage. She was the great-niece of Michel Ney, Marshal of France. Early in life, she declared that her goal was "to know great persons."

Career

Europe
Ney grew up assisting her father in his work. She went on a weeks-long hunger strike when her parents opposed her becoming a sculptor, prompting her parents to request the assistance of their local bishop. Her parents finally relented and in 1852, she became the first female sculpture student at the Munich Academy of Art under professor Max von Widnmann. She received her diploma on July 29, 1854. After graduating she moved to Berlin to study under Christian Daniel Rauch. Under Rauch she studied realism and the German artistic tradition, and began sculpting her first portraits of the German elite.

Ney opened a studio in Berlin in 1857. The German philosopher Arthur Schopenhauer agreed to sit for a sculpted portrait at the persuasion of Edmund Montgomery, whom she would marry in 1863. It was hailed as an artistic success and led to other commissions, most notably Jacob Grimm of the Brothers Grimm, the Italian military leader Giuseppe Garibaldi, the composer Richard Wagner, Cosima von Bülow (the daughter of Franz Liszt and Wagner's future wife), the Prussian-German political figure Otto von Bismarck, and King George V of Hanover. The latter also commissioned bust portraits of the composer Josef Joachim and his wife, the contralto Amalie Weiss Joachim. Shortly after completing the Bismarck bust, Ney was commissioned in 1868 by Prussian agents to sculpt a full-length portrait of Ludwig II of Bavaria in Munich.

United States
In the early 1880s, Ney, by then a Texas resident, was invited to Austin by Governor Oran M. Roberts, which resulted in the resumption of her artistic career. In 1892, she built a studio named Formosa in the Hyde Park neighborhood north of Austin and began to seek commissions.

Ney missed the deadline and the sculptures were not shown at the Exhibition. The marble sculptures of Houston and Austin can now be seen in both the Texas State Capitol in Austin and in the National Statuary Hall Collection in the U.S. Capitol in Washington, D.C. She was commissioned to sculpt a memorial to the career military officer and war hero Albert Sidney Johnston for his grave in the Texas State Cemetery. One of her signature works was the figure of Lady Macbeth; the plaster model is in the Elisabet Ney Museum and the completed marble is in the Smithsonian American Art Museum collection. She succeeded in having the orator, three-time presidential candidate, and noted attorney William Jennings Bryan sit for a portrait; she hoped to sell replicas of this bust to debate clubs across the country.

Her 1903 life-size portrait bust of David Thomas Iglehart can be found at Symphony Square in Austin, where it is on permanent loan to the Austin Symphony Society. What is considered to be possible the last known work of Ney, a sculpture of a tousled haired cherub resting over a grave and known as the 1906 Schnerr Memorial, can be found at Der Stadt Friedhof in Fredericksburg, Texas.

In addition to her sculpting activities, Ney was also active in cultural affairs in Austin. Formosa become a center for cultural gatherings and curiosity seekers. The composer Paderewski and the Russian ballerina Anna Pavlova were among her visitors.

Personal life

While visiting friends in Heidelberg in 1853, Ney met a young Scottish medical student, scientist, and philosopher named Edmund Montgomery. They kept in touch, and, although she viewed the institution of marriage as a state of bondage for women, after he established a medical practice in Madeira, they were married at the British consulate there on November 7, 1863.

Ney, however, remained outspoken about women's roles. She refused to use Montgomery's name, often denied she was even married, and once remarked:

She wore pants and rode her horses astride as men did. She liked to fashion her own clothes, which, in addition to the slacks, included boots and a black artist frock coat.

Montgomery was diagnosed with tuberculosis in 1863. By 1870, the Franco-Prussian War had begun. In autumn of that year, Ney became pregnant with their first child. Montgomery received a letter from his friend, Baron Carl Vicco Otto Friedrich Constantin von Stralendorff of Mecklenburg-Schwerin, who had moved to Thomasville, Georgia with his new wife, Margaret Elizabeth Russell of Boston, Massachusetts, declaring the location "Earth's paradise."  On January 14, 1871, Ney and Montgomery, accompanied by their housekeeper, Cenci, immigrated to Georgia, to a colony promoted as a resort for consumptives. Their first son, Arthur, was born there in 1871, but died two years later (possibly of diphtheria, but the cause of death is disputed). Unfortunately, the Thomasville colony did not work out as they had hoped. Baron and Baroness von Stralendorff returned to Wismar, Germany where he died on July 1, 1872.

Ney and Montgomery looked elsewhere in the United States for a place to live, including Red Wing, Minnesota, where their second son, Lorne (1872–1913), was born. Later that year, Ney traveled alone to Texas. With the help of Julius Runge a businessman in Galveston, she was shown Liendo Plantation near Hempstead in Waller County.  On March 4, 1873, Montgomery and the rest of the family arrived, and they purchased the plantation. While he tended to his research, she ran it for the next twenty years.

Death and legacy

Ney died in her studio on June 29, 1907, and is buried next to Montgomery, who died four years later, at Liendo Plantation.

Upon her death, Montgomery sold the Formosa studio to Ella Dancy Dibrell. As per her wishes, its contents were bequeathed to the University of Texas at Austin, but were to remain in the building. On April 6, 1911, Dibrell and other friends established the Texas Fine Arts Association (after more than a century in existence, the organization is now known as the Contemporary Austin) in her honor. It is the oldest Texas-wide organization existing for support of the visual arts. Formosa is now the home of the Elisabet Ney Museum. In 1941, the City of Austin took over the ownership and operation.

In 1961, Lake Jackson Primary School in Lake Jackson, Texas was renamed Elisabet Ney Elementary School in her honor.

Gallery

Works
Below is a partial listing of her works.

References

Additional sources

Selected Bibliography, Elisabet Ney Museum 
 Cutrer, Emily Fourmy, The Art of the Woman: The Life and Work of Elisabet Ney, University of Nebraska Press, Lincoln, Nebraska, 1988
 Fortune, Jan and Jean Barton, Elisabet Ney, Alfred A. Knopf, New York, 1943
 Hendricks, Patricia D. and Becky Duval Reese, A Century of Sculpture in Texas: 1889–1989 (exhibition catalog), Archer M. Huntington Art Gallery, University of Texas Press, Austin, Texas, 1989
 Little, Carol Morris, A Comprehensive Guide to Outdoor Sculpture in Texas, University of Texas Press, Austin, Texas, 1996

External links

 
 Official site of the Elisabet Ney Museum
 Elisabet Ney, Sculptor, hosted by the Portal to Texas History
 "Lady Macbeth" Smithsonian American Art Museum
 Entry for Elisabet Ney on the Union List of Artist Names
 www.austintexas.gov/Elizabetney

1833 births
1907 deaths
People from Münster
German emigrants to the United States
German-American culture in Texas
Alsatian-German people
Sculptors from Texas
Academy of Fine Arts, Munich alumni
American women sculptors
German women artists
19th-century German sculptors
19th-century American sculptors
20th-century American sculptors
20th-century American women artists
19th-century American women artists